Mark Francis Napier (21 January 1852 – 19 August 1919) was a Scottish Liberal Party politician who served as the Member of Parliament (MP) for Roxburghshire in the 25th Parliament between 1892 and 1895.

Napier was born in Naples, the fourth son of Francis Napier, 10th Lord Napier. Educated at Wellington College, Berkshire, and Trinity College, Cambridge, he was a Freemason who joined the Isaac Newton University Lodge whilst a student at university. After graduating from Cambridge with a BA degree in 1874, Napier was then called to the Bar at the Inner Temple two years later. He subsequently practised as a barrister prior to being elected to Parliament.

References 

UK MPs 1892–1895
People from Norfolk
Date of birth missing
1852 births
1919 deaths
Scottish Liberal Party MPs
People from Roxburgh
Alumni of Trinity College, Cambridge
Members of Isaac Newton University Lodge
Younger sons of barons